David Ernest Apter (December 18, 1924 – May 4, 2010) was an American political scientist and sociologist. He was Henry J. Heinz Professor of Comparative Political and Social Development and senior research scientist at Yale University.

He was born on December 18, 1924. He taught at Northwestern University, the University of Chicago (where he was the executive secretary of the Committee for the Comparative Study of New Nations), the University of California, (where he was director of the Institute of International Studies), and Yale University, where he held a joint appointment in political science and sociology and served as director of the Social Science Division, chair of Sociology, and was a founding fellow of the Whitney Humanities Center. He was elected a Fellow of the American Academy of Arts and Sciences in 1966.

He was a Guggenheim Fellow, a visiting fellow at All Souls College, Oxford, a Fellow of the Institute for Advanced Study in Princeton, New Jersey, a Fellow of the Center for Advanced Study in the Behavioral Sciences in Palo Alto, California, a Fellow of the Netherlands Institute for Advanced Study, as well as a Phi Beta Kappa Lecturer.  He did field research on development, democratization and political violence in Africa, Latin America, Japan (Sanrizuka Struggle etc.), and China.

In 2006 he was the first recipient of the Foundation Mattei Dogan prize for contributions to Interdisciplinary research.

Apter died in his home in North Haven, Connecticut, from complications due to cancer on May 4, 2010.

Bibliography

Monographs
 

  (Japanese, Turkish, and Indonesian editions subsequently published)

  (Japanese edition: Iwanami)

Essay collections

Received the Woodrow Wilson Foundation award for the best book of the year on government, politics, or international affairs)

Edited volumes

References

External links
 David Ernest Apter Papers (MS 1806). Manuscripts and Archives, Yale University Library.

1924 births
2010 deaths
Northwestern University faculty
University of Chicago faculty
University of California, Berkeley faculty
Yale University faculty
Institute for Advanced Study visiting scholars
American political scientists
Antioch College alumni
Fellows of the American Academy of Arts and Sciences
People from North Haven, Connecticut